The Mitchell Kittiwake is a British single engine sporting aircraft designed for amateur building. Plans were available for both single-seat and two-seat versions, but only four were constructed.

Development

Mitchell-Procter Aircraft was set up to produce the Kittwake prototype. This single-seat sports aircraft was a development of the Mitchell-Prizeman Scamp design study that was placed third in the Rollason Midget Racer Competition of 1964.  C. G. B. Mitchell was the Kittiwake's designer, with R. G. Procter in charge of building it. The Mitchell-Procter Kittiwake I first flew in May 1967, but about 17 months later the partnership was dissolved and plans for home builders were produced by Procter Aircraft Associates.  Mitchell concentrated on the design of a two-seat development, the Mitchell Kittiwake II, with Robinson Aircraft building the prototype. At about the same time Procter Aircraft were designing their own rather larger two-seat Kittiwake I development, the Procter Petrel.  Both the two seaters, like the Kittiwake I, were intended for home building.

The single-seat Kittiwake I monoplane was designed for sports flying and as a glider tug. It is an all-metal aircraft, with low  cantilever wings of parallel chord built around a single spar carrying 5° of dihedral. NACA single slotted flaps occupy the whole of the trailing edge inboard of the ailerons. The wings attach to a centre section which is integral with the fuselage, a feature intended to help construction in a small space like a garage.  The straight tapered fin carries a horn balanced rudder and the constant chord tailplane has a starboard side trim tab.

The Kittiwake's fuselage is built around four longerons, with flat sides and bottom and single curvature decking.  Its overwing cockpit has a rearward sliding canopy and its fixed tricycle undercarriage has cantilever angled steel spring main legs attached to the lower longerons, giving a track of 5 ft 9 in (1.75 m). The Kittiwake I was powered by a 100 hp (75 kW) Continental O-200 flat four engine.

The Kittiwake II differs chiefly in having two side-by-side seating and a more powerful 130 hp (97 kW) Continental O-240. It is longer, heavier and has an increased span which increases the wing area by about 8%.  The fuselage is wider and the small dorsal fillet of the Kittiwake I gone; the rudder gained a trim tab and the elevators full width tabs. It first flew on 19 March 1972.

Operational history
In addition to the prototype, two Kittiwake Is were built, one by Royal Navy apprentices in 1971 for glider towing.  For this role a larger diameter (6 ft 4 in, 1.93 m) propeller is fitted, increasing the rate of climb by 24%. A tow release hook is fitted under the tail.  Only one Kittiwake II, the prototype, was built.

Survivors

One Kittiwake was active until at least at 2005 and the other is still active. They remain on the UK Civil Register. These are the prototype, G-ATXN and the ex-Naval G-BBRN.  The latter is painted, as in its Naval days, as XW784.

Specifications (Kittiwake I)

References

1960s British sport aircraft
Glider tugs
Single-engined tractor aircraft
Low-wing aircraft
Aircraft first flown in 1967